The 1963 All-Ireland Junior Hurling Championship was the 42nd staging of the All-Ireland Junior Championship since its establishment by the Gaelic Athletic Association in 1912.

Kildare entered the championship as the defending champions, however, they were beaten in the Leinster Championship.

The All-Ireland final was played on 29 September 1963 at Casement Park in Belfast, between London and Antrim, in what was their second meeting in the final. London won the match by 4–07 to 3–06 to claim their fifth championship title.

Results

All-Ireland Junior Hurling Championship

All-Ireland semi-finals

All-Ireland home final

All-Ireland final

References

Junior
All-Ireland Junior Hurling Championship